Forever the Sickest Kids is the eponymous second studio album by American pop punk band Forever the Sickest Kids, released on March 1, 2011. It is their last release through Universal Motown Records, and also last to feature members Kent Garrison and Marc Stewart. Following the release of their 2009 EP The Weekend: Friday, the band worked on material for what was originally a continuation of the EP but instead wrote more songs than intended, and scrapped the idea to work on a second full-length record. The album received mixed reviews from critics who commended the band's attempt at maturity with diverse musicianship and catchability but found it inconsistent. Forever the Sickest Kids debuted at number 33 on the Billboard 200 and spawned three singles: "Keep On Bringing Me Down", "I Guess You Can Say Things Are Getting Pretty Serious" and "Summer Song".

Background
During the writing of the songs, a five-piece EP entitled The Weekend: Saturday was originally intended for the next release from the band, as part of their continuation of their previous release, The Weekend: Friday. However, numerous songs were written and it was decided to release a full-length album instead of the EP. When speaking about the album, vocalist Jonathan Cook stated, "This is like, a year and a half in the making with some different planning. We thought we might put it out as an EP, five songs a piece. And then, we just started writing more and more songs, before you knew it we had eleven songs that we were passionate about. So, we're like, "Why not put it out as a full-length album?". This album is also the last to feature keyboardist Kent Garrison and guitarist Marc Stewart.

Composition
The album starts out with "Keep On Bringing Me Down", which Alternative Press described as a "picture-perfect uptempo pop-punk" song, that deals with a crying out question as to why the world brings people down. "I Guess You Can Say Things Are Getting Pretty Serious" has been described as a "high-voltage pop-tune", driven by Cook's addictive vocals and distorted guitars by Caleb Turman and Marc Stewart. "Life of the Party" is an electronic, upbeat, dance-influenced song. "Robots & Aliens" is an upbeat, feel-good song that deals with one waiting for another in a relationship, with AbsolutePunk stating the song could've been a "huge radio hit". Drummer Kyle Burns claimed the song was recorded right before My Chemical Romance's "Na Na Na (Na Na Na Na Na Na Na Na Na)". "King for a Day" is a softer tune, equipped with synth and a catchy chorus, dealing with the wish of being king for a day in order to give a girl anything. "Good Life" is a song that deals with the common subject of desiring the good life.

The seventh track, "Same Dumb Excuse (Nothing to Lose)", is another electronic, dance-influenced song with Cook singing about how one in a relationship should be brave and confident instead of feeling they have anything to lose. Cook has stated this is his favorite song from the album. "Bipolar, Baby!" is an electronic pop-influenced song that deals with a girl who poorly treats a relationship. "Summer Song" is an upbeat, pop rock song revolving around the joy and happiness of summer. "Forever Girl", which was compared to the band's previous song "Coffee Break" from Underdog Alma Mater, is an acoustic song sung by Turman dedicating love to a girlfriend. The closing track, "What Happened to Emotion? (Killing Me)", is a big, powerful, ballad that deals with how one feels they deserve to be treated better. "This song defines our sound best," Cook stated.

Release
The first single released from the album, "Keep On Bringing Me Down", was released on September 14, 2010. The track listing and album artwork were later revealed on the band's website when the album was made available for pre-order. On their tour during December, the band began to perform the songs "I Guess You Can Say Things Are Getting Pretty Serious" and "Life of the Party." On February 11, 2011, the band released an instrumental version of the track, "What Happened to Emotion? (Killing Me)" on their official YouTube account. Three days later, the track "Forever Girl" was also released from their YouTube account.

In June 2011, "I Guess You Can Say Things Are Getting Pretty Serious" was released as the second single, with a music video released by the band. A month later, the track "Summer Song" was released as the third single and was also followed by a music video.

Garrison's departure was announced on January 10, 2011, stating he wanted to "pursue other opportunities." Stewart's announcement of leaving the band was put on his Twitter account on September 22, 2011. The band later confirmed his departure, due to his recent marriage. The band's friend and crew member, Rico Garcia, became a touring member to replace Stewart during performances. The band later stated that Garrison and Stewart had both planned on heading back to college as further reasons for leaving the band. In October and November, the group supported Simple Plan on their headlining US tour. In September 2012, the group performed at the Bazooka Rocks Festival in the Philippines.

This would also be the group's last Motown album before the label was separated from Universal Motown Records, shutting down Universal Motown Republic Group in the process.

Critical reception

The album received mostly mixed reviews. While most music critics commended the diversity and catchiness of the album and at the more mature attempts made by the band, some still felt it wasn't consistent and contained clichéd lyrics and sound. Many reviewers praised Cook's vocals, calling them "assured and punchy" and were pleased with the absence of Auto-Tune, which was occasionally used in the band's previous releases. Tim Sendra of AllMusic wrote, "His impassioned yelping on the rockers and his twee crooning on the ballads are one of the album’s highlights."

Many reviewers heavily criticized the song "Life of the Party". Davey Boy of Sputnikmusic stated that out of all the songs on the album, the song was "the most unbearable and childish". Sendra stated that it was "clichéd and clumsy." Ryan Gardner of AbsolutePunk wrote that the song was "littered with auto-tune, electronic drums, and synth over dosage. The result: arguably one of the worst songs FTSK have ever penned, channeling Good Morning Revival-era Good Charlotte, which is never a good thing."

On a positive note, reviews claimed "Keep On Bringing Me Down", "I Guess You Can Say Things Are Getting Pretty Serious", and "What Happened to Emotion? (Killing Me)" were the best tracks on the album. Gardner said of "Keep On Bringing Me Down" and "I Guess You Can Say Things Are Getting Pretty Serious" that they "begin the record on a high note, leaving the listener bouncing around to poppy cravings." Evan Lucy of Alternative Press wrote of "Keep On Bringing Me Down" that it "might be their best song since 2008’s Underdog Alma Mater." "What Happened to Emotion? (Killing Me)" was described by Gardner as "simply bombastic." He continued by saying, "Cook’s melody over the soaring guitars makes the track huge; the changes from fast to slow make for a truly solid number, and easily one of the best tracks on the record."

Track listing
All vocals by Bello, Cook, and Turman, except where noted.

Personnel 

Forever the Sickest Kids
 Jonathan Cook – vocals, piano on "What Happened to Emotion? (Killing Me)"
 Austin Bello – bass guitar, vocals
 Caleb Turman – rhythm guitar, vocals, acoustic guitar on "Forever Girl"
 Marc Stewart – lead guitar
 Kent Garrison – keyboard, synthesizer
 Kyle Burns – drums, percussion

Additional
 Tom Coyne – mastering
 Shep Goodman – A&R
 Album art and layout by Kyle Burns

Charts

References

2011 albums
Forever the Sickest Kids albums
Universal Motown Records albums
Albums produced by Aaron Accetta
Albums produced by Shep Goodman
Albums produced by David Bendeth